Chuck Barnes (C.M. Barnes, Jr.) (1930–1979) was an American executive.

The son of then Dayton Tire & Rubber Company president C.M. "Pat" Barnes and a former P.R. manager for Firestone, Barnes spearheaded the field of sports management when he founded Sports Headliners, Inc. in 1965.  Initially representing racing greats Mario Andretti, Jim Clark, A. J. Foyt and Rodger Ward, Barnes expanded into professional football and basketball, signing Johnny Unitas, O. J. Simpson, Calvin Hill and Pat Hayden, among others.  The lucrative contract that Barnes negotiated for Simpson when he joined the Buffalo Bills set a new benchmark for NFL salaries.

Barnes was one of the original investors who, in 1967, purchased the (then ABA) franchise that became the Indiana Pacers.  In addition, Barnes briefly served as President, then Commissioner of the World Football League and was on the board of directors of the (former) Ontario Motor Speedway.

American Basketball Association executives
Indiana Pacers executives
Tire industry people
1930 births
1979 deaths
20th-century American businesspeople